FN may refer to:

Arts, entertainment, and media 
 Faking News, Indian news satire website
 Financial News, UK financial newspaper and news website
 Finding Nemo, a 2003 computer-animated adventure comedy film by Disney and Pixar
 Fortnite, a game released in 2017 by Epic Games
 Future Nostalgia, a 2020 album by Dua Lipa
 "F.N" (song), a 2019 song by Lil Tjay

Businesses and brands 
 FN Herstal or Fabrique Nationale de Herstal, a Belgian arms factory
 FN (automobile), cars produced by FN Herstal
 FN (motorcycle), motorcycles produced by FN Herstal
 Royal Air Maroc Express (IATA airline designator FN)

Organizations 
 Front National (France), a French political party
 Front National (French Resistance), a World War II French Resistance group
 Front National (Belgium), a Belgian political party
 Fuerza Nueva, the name of a former succession of political parties in Spain
 Forza Nuova, an Italian political party

Other uses 
 First Nations in Canada, the predominant indigenous peoples in Canada, south of the Arctic Circle
 Fn key, a key found on some compact keyboards
 Fibronectin, a glycoprotein involved in cell adhesion and growth
 Function (computer science)
 Fireman, an enlisted rate in the United States Navy and United States Coast Guard
 Footnote, in texts